The 17th Directors Guild of America Awards, honoring the outstanding directorial achievements in film and television in 1964, were presented in 1965.

Winners and nominees

Film

Television

Honorary Life Member
 Jack L. Warner

External links
 

Directors Guild of America Awards
1964 film awards
1964 television awards
Direct
Direct
1964 awards in the United States